The Very Cranky Bear is a 2008 Children's picture book by Nick Bland. It is about four animal friends, Moose, Lion, Zebra, and Sheep, who enter a cave to get out of a rainstorm and disturb a bear.

Publication history
2008, Australia, Scholastic Australia, 
2009, United Kingdom, Hodder Childrens, 
2011, Canada, Scholastic, 
2014, USA, Orchard Books, 
2020, Italy, as "Orso che broncio!", Caissa Italia,

Reception
A review in Publishers Weekly of The Very Cranky Bear wrote "Using a singsong rhyme scheme and a comically bumbling animal cast, Bland (The Runaway Hug) playfully introduces the concepts of consideration and respect in a story first published in Australia in 2008", and Kirkus Reviews called it "Good, not-so-cranky fun."

The Very Cranky Bear has also been reviewed by CM: Canadian Review of Materials, Booklist, School Library Journal, The Horn Book, and Library Media Connection.

It was the 2012 National Simultaneous Storytime book.

Adaptations
Cranky Bear, a theatrical adaption of The Very Cranky Bear, has been made by Patch Theatre.

References

External links

 Library holdings of The Very Cranky Bear

2008 children's books
Australian picture books
Books about bears
Fictional sheep
Fictional deer and moose
Books about lions
Fictional zebras